Limetree Bay Refinery (known also as Hovensa)  is an oil refinery located on the island of Saint Croix in the United States Virgin Islands. The refinery was a joint venture between Hess Corporation and PDVSA. For most of its operating life as HOVENSA, it supplied heating oil and gasoline to the U.S. Gulf Coast and the eastern seaboard with the crude mainly sourced from Venezuela. Previously it had sourced its crude feedstock from a number of other countries including Libya.

Hess Oil Virgin Islands Corporation started refinery construction in January 1966 having purchased the property from Annie de Chabert and, in October of the same year, the refinery started operating. Hovensa LLC, which took over the refinery operatorship, was established in 1998.

In January 2011, Hovensa paid a $5.3 million penalty for Clean Air Act violations.  The company closed the refinery in 2012, operating the property continued as a storage terminal only until that closed in 2015. A purchase proposal by Atlantic Basin Refining was vetoed by the USVI Senate, but in November 2015 a joint venture (of ArcLight Capital Partners and Freepoint Commodities) called Limetree Bay Terminals succeeded in purchasing the Refinery.

On November 30, 2018 Limetree Bay announced it had closed on $1.25 billion dollars of financing for the refinery to partially reopen by the end of 2019.

On June 23,2022 Government House in Christiansted issued a notice that Port Hamilton Refining and Transportation LLLP (PHRT) had acquired the assets of Hovensa (Limetree Bay Refinery on St. Croix) through the U.S. Bankruptcy Court for the Southern District of Texas, Houston Division, Case 21-32351.  They maintain that they will reopen it when it is safe to do so.  The EPA shut down the facility in May 2021 after residents across the island reported feeling nauseous and ill from the release of fumes.

References

External links
 Multinational Monitor: Hess Oil Virgin Islands
 

Oil refineries in the United States Virgin Islands
1966 establishments in the United States Virgin Islands
Industrial buildings completed in 1966